"Demons" is a song by American rock band Imagine Dragons. It was written by Alex da Kid, Ben McKee, Dan Reynolds, Wayne Sermon, Josh Mosser and produced by Alex da Kid. The song appears on their major-label debut extended play, Continued Silence, and also makes an appearance on their debut studio album, Night Visions, as the fourth track. "Demons" was solicited to American triple-A radio stations on January 28, 2013 and to modern rock stations two months later, on April 1, 2013. It serves as the album's overall fifth single and was released as the third single from Night Visions in the United States, later released to US contemporary hit radio stations on 17 September 2013 as an official single. The lyrics portray the protagonist warning the significant other of his or her flaws.

The song was a commercial success, becoming their second top ten single after "Radioactive".  It spent twelve weeks in the top ten on the Billboard Hot 100, four of which were spent at its number six peak. It is Imagine Dragons' second song to stay more than one year on the Hot 100 (61 weeks).  Within two years of its release, more than 4.1 million copies were sold in the United States, making it the eighth most downloaded song in rock history at the time. It has also been a moderate commercial success worldwide, charting in several countries.  The song won a MuchMusic Video Award for International Video of the Year – Group (2014) and an iHeartRadio Music Award for Alternative Rock Song of the Year (2014).

Composition
The song is written in C minor with a slow-moderate tempo.

Music video
An MTV report on the "Demons" music video stated that it would "fit nicely with the artful imagery of 'It's Time' and the thoroughly out-there puppet grappling of 'Radioactive'." Released on May 7, 2013 and shot in Las Vegas, Nevada at the band's performance at The Joint on February 9, 2013, the video features a mix of live footage of the band and a companion narrative. Various characters with personal hardships are depicted, including a grieving daughter, a man with Marfan syndrome who stares at himself in a mirror, a victim of parental abuse and a military veteran. The meaning imposed is that most do not see beyond the face that everyone puts on for the public. The clip ends with a dedication to Tyler Robinson (1995–2013), a fan of the band who died at the age of 17 in March 2013 following a battle with cancer. The music reached the one billion view milestone on July 18, 2022.

In popular culture 
In 2021, the song received resurgence as a joke about semen with several videos of white liquid being sprayed or spilled after listening to the misheard lyric, 'This is my kingdom come'.

Track listing

Charts

Weekly charts

Year-end charts

Decade-end charts

Certifications

Accolades

Release history

Personnel
Dan Reynolds – lead vocals
Daniel Wayne Sermon – guitars, backing vocals
Ben McKee – bass, keyboards, backing vocals
Daniel Platzman – drums, backing vocals

Additional musicians
 J Brownz – additional guitar, additional bass

References

2012 songs
2013 singles
Imagine Dragons songs
Song recordings produced by Alex da Kid
Songs written by Alex da Kid
Kidinakorner singles
Interscope Records singles
Universal Music Group singles
Rock ballads
2010s ballads
Songs written by Wayne Sermon
Songs written by Dan Reynolds (musician)
Songs written by Daniel Platzman
Songs written by Ben McKee
Songs containing the I–V-vi-IV progression
Pop ballads